Events in the year 1919 in Norway.

Incumbents
Monarch – Haakon VII

Events

 Production of zinc begins in Glomfjord at the state-owned industrial plant.
 Municipal and county elections are held throughout the country.

Popular culture

Sports

Helge Løvland, track and field athlete and gymnast; becomes the second to receive the Egebergs Ærespris, an award presented to Norwegian athletes who excel at two (or more) different sports.

Music

Film

Literature
 The Olav Duun novel I Blinda (The Blind Man) from the work Juvikfolket (The People of Juvik, 1918–23), was published.

Births

January to March
14 January – Harry Hansen, politician (died 2003)
17 January – Per Bergsland, Royal Air Force pilot and prisoner of war (died 1992)
31 January – Claus Helberg, resistance fighter and mountain guide (died 2003)
11 February – Erland Steenberg, politician (died 2009)
15 February – Asbjørn Herteig, archeologist (died 2006).
2 March – Carl Mortensen, sailor and Olympic silver medallist (died 2005)
5 March – Helge Seip, politician (died 2004)
17 March – Erik Rinde, jurist and pioneer of social sciences in Norway (died 1994)
18 March – Laila Schou Nilsen, speed skater, alpine skier and tennis player (died 1998)

April to June
1 April – Olav Brænden, pharmacist (died 1989)
13 April – Nils Reinhardt Christensen, film director and screenwriter (died 1990)
14 April – Bjarne Berg-Sæther, politician (died 2009)
19 April – Asbjørn Lillås, politician (died 1983)
21 April – Kristian Fougner, engineer and resistance member (died 2012) 
25 April – Finn Helgesen, speed skater and Olympic gold medallist (died 2011)
6 May – Nils Uhlin Hansen, long jumper and resistance member (died 1945)
18 May – Ottar Landfald, politician (died 2009)
6 June – Rita Haugerud, politician (died 2014)
29 June – Johannes Heggland, author and politician (died 2008)

July to September
14 July – Arnold Dyrdahl, bobsledder (died 1973)
3 August – Thor Gystad, politician (died 2007)
3 August – Ola M. Hestenes, politician (died 2008)
4 August – Engly Lie, politician (died 2001)
9 August – Liv Andersen, politician (died 1997)
13 August – Børre Falkum-Hansen, sailor and Olympic silver medalist (died 2006)
25 August – Alf Nordhus, barrister (died 1997)
27 August – Bjørn Rørholt, engineer, military officer and resistance member (died 1993).
30 August – Joachim Rønneberg, resistance fighter and broadcaster (died 2018)
15 September – Eilert Dahl, Nordic skier (died 2004)
30 September – Olav O. Nomeland, politician (died 1986)

October to December
26 October – Knut Andreas Knudsen, politician (died 2001)
4 November – Per Olav Baarnaas, race walker (died 2004).
29 November – Aksel Fossen, politician (died 2009)
11 December – Elsa Skjerven, politician and minister (died 2005)
22 December – Bjarne Orten, civil servant (died 2011)
27 December – Gunnar Alf Larsen, politician (died 2003)

Full date unknown
Odd Chr. Gøthe, civil servant and politician (died 2002)
Reidar Haaland, police officer and collaborator, executed (died 1945)
Finn Hødnebø, philologist (died 2007)
Odd Narud, businessperson (died 2000)
Olav Nordrå, writer (died 1994)
Asbjørn Ruud, ski jumper and World Champion (died 1986)
Aage Samuelsen, evangelist, singer and composer (died 1987)
Victor Sparre, visual artist (died 2008)
Jakob Sverdrup, historian (died 1997)

Deaths
12 January – Carl Wilhelm Bøckmann Barth, painter (born 1847).
25 February – Gulbrand Hagen, newspaper editor and writer in America (born 1864)
4 March – Sigurd Mathisen, speed skater and world champion (born 1884)
16 April – Anders Nicolai Kiær, statistician (born 1838)
22 May – Jens Ludvig Andersen Aars, politician (born 1852)
12 June – Alf Collett, writer (born 1844)
29 June – Ole Falck Ebbell, architect (born 1839)
12 August – Oscar Sigvald Julius Strugstad, politician and Minister (born 1851)
22 October – Cathinka Guldberg, Norway's first nurse (born 1840)

See also

References

External links

 
Norway
Norway